Gloucester-Southgate Ward (Ward 10) is a city ward located in Ottawa, Ontario. Located in the city's south end, the ward includes Gloucester Glen east of the Rideau River, most of the Ottawa International Airport, CFSU Uplands, Blossom Park, Greenboro, Hunt Club Park, portions of Heron Gate south of Walkley Road, the Ottawa South/Hawthorne Industrial Park and rural areas west of Anderson Road and north of Leitrim. Previously, the ward included the community of Riverside South located south of the airport but in a ward reorganization, the growing community was included in the new ward of Gloucester-South Nepean.

Prior to amalgamation, this area was covered by Southgate Ward on Ottawa City Council and Gloucester South Ward on Gloucester City Council. Southgate Ward was known as Billings Ward from 1980 to 1994, and Gloucester Ward prior to that. The ward was created in 1950, when the area was annexed from Gloucester Township. From 1952 to 1956 it was part of Ward 1.

City councillors

Ottawa City Council
Prior to 1950, the area was part of Gloucester Township. Township council was elected on an at-large basis, meaning no wards existed.
Alex Roger (1950)
Archibald Newman (1950-1952)
Pat Doherty (1951-1952)
Ward merged with Rideau Ward to become Ward 1 from 1952-1956
Pat Doherty (1957-1958)
Alex Roger (1957-1960)
Murray Heit (1957-1964)
Pat Doherty (1961-1962)
Don Kay (1963-1966)
Pat Doherty (1965-1966)
Jim Knubley (1967-1969)
Joe Quinn (1967-1980)
Pat Doherty (1970-1972)
Brian Bourns (1980-1985)
Joan O'Neill (1985-1994)
Diane Deans (1994–2022)
Jessica Bradley (2022–present)

Gloucester City Council
Gloucester adopted a ward system in 1985. Gloucester South was represented by two city councillors until 1991. 
Claudette Cain (1985-1991) 
Harold Keenan (1985-1988)
Mitch Owens (1988-1991)
Daniel Beamish (1991-1994)
George Barrett (1994-2000)

Election results

2022 Ottawa municipal election

2018 Ottawa municipal election

2014 Ottawa municipal election

2010 Ottawa municipal election

2006 Ottawa municipal election

2003 Ottawa municipal election

2000 Ottawa municipal election
Following amalgamation, Ottawa City Councillor Diane Deans defeated Gloucester City councillor George Barrett.

1997 Ottawa-Carleton Regional Municipality elections

1994 Ottawa-Carleton Regional Municipality elections

1950 special election
Upon annexation by Ottawa, Gloucester Ward held a special election January 2, 1950. Two aldermen were elected.

References

External links
 Map of Gloucester-Southgate Ward

Ottawa wards